Royal Captain was a three-decked East Indiaman, launched in 1760, that made four voyages for the British East India Company between 1761 and 1771. She was sold 1771 for breaking up.

Voyages

Voyage #1 (1761–63)
Captain Nathaniel Tanner left Portsmouth on 26 May 1761, bound for Bombay and China. Royal Captain reached Cochin on 12 December, and arrived at Bombay on 2 January 1762. She then sailed to Muscat, which she reached on 19 March, Bandar Abbas (29 March), Muscat again (20 April), and Bombay again (5 May). From there she sailed to  Trincomalee, which she reached on 19 June, Madras for the third time (3 July), and finally arrived at Whampoa on 8 November. For her return voyage she crossed the Second Bar, 20 miles or so downriver from Whampoa, on  4 January 1763. However, after the Indiaman Elizabeth caught fire and was destroyed off Lintin Bar in the Canton River on 27 January, Royal Captain took aboard 24 of her crew. The rest of the East Indiamen in China took aboard the rest. Royal Captain reached  St Helena 12 April, and arrived at the Downs on 5 July.

Voyage #2 (1765–66)
Tanner left Portsmouth on 29 January 1765, bound for Madras and China. Royal Captain reached Johanna on 25 May, and arrived at Madras on 25 June. On 9 August she reached Malacca and arrived at Whampoa on 22 September. She crossed the Second Bar on 6 February 1766, reached St Helena on 7 June, and arrived at the Downs on  29 August.

Voyage #3 (1768–69)
Tanner left the Downs on 7 April 1768, bound for Bombay. She reached Johanna on 1 August and arrived at Bombay on 27 August.  After she left Bombay, she reached Tellicherry on 15 December, Cochin on 22 December, Anjengo on 26 December, St Helena on 6 March 1769, and the Downs on 26 May.

Voyage # 4 (1770–71)
Captain Edward Barrow (or Berrow), left Portsmouth on 22 February 1770, bound for Benkulen and China. She reached the Cape on 20 May, Benkulen on 15 July, and Whampoa on 10 September. Homeward bound, she crossed the Second Bar on 31 December, reached St Helena on 9 April 1771, and arrived at the Downs on 8 July.

Fate
Royal Captain was sold in 1771 for breaking up.

Notes

Citations

References
 
 
 

Ships of the British East India Company
Ships built in Rotherhithe
1761 ships
Ships of the United Kingdom
Age of Sail merchant ships
Merchant ships of the United Kingdom